Text Publishing is an independent Australian publisher of fiction and non-fiction, based in Melbourne, Victoria.

Company background
Text Media was founded in Melbourne in 1990 by Diana Gribble and Eric Beecher, along with designer Chong Weng Ho and others, with a small book publishing division known as Text Publishing. Michael Heyward joined in 1992, and the small publishing house became independent in 1994.

When Text Media was taken over by Fairfax Media in 2004, Michael Heyward and his wife Penny Hueston entered into a joint venture with Scottish publisher Canongate.

Maureen and Tony Wheeler, founders of Lonely Planet, bought Canongate's share in Text in 2011, making it a wholly Australian-owned company. 

In 2012, Text launched a series of Australian classics, republishing out-of-print works.

People
As of August 2022, Heyward was the publisher.

Awards

Text awards
The Text Prize for Young Adult and Children’s Writing was inaugurated in 2008 and is awarded annually. As of 2021 it was valued at AU$10,000. 

In 2021 Text announced the Steph Bowe Mentorship for Young Writers. It is open to writers under 25 years of age and provides 20 hours of manuscript development assistance and writers' centre membership to the winner.

Awards won by Text
Text has won the ABIA Small Publisher of the Year award three times, and in both 2018 and 2019 was awarded the Leading Edge Books Small Publisher of the Year award.

Significant publications
Notable publications by Text include:
Eucalyptus by Murray Bail 
The Secret River, by Kate Grenville 
Stasiland, by Anna Funder 
The Weather Makers, by Tim Flannery 
Dancing with Strangers, by Inga Clendinnen
Truth, by Peter Temple
The Rosie Project, by Graeme Simsion (2013)

References

External link

Publishing companies of Australia
Companies based in Melbourne
Book publishing companies of Australia